Bhogerr Mong is a village and union council (an administrative subdivision) of Mansehra District in Khyber-Pakhtunkhwa province of Pakistan.

References

Union councils of Mansehra District
Populated places in Mansehra District